Gibbula clandestina is a species of sea snail, a marine gastropod mollusk in the family Trochidae, the top snails.

Description
The shell grows to a height of 2.4 mm.

Distribution
This species occurs in the Atlantic Ocean off Cape Verde.

References

clandestina
Gastropods of Cape Verde
Gastropods described in 2001